This is a list of television programs currently broadcast (in first-run or reruns), scheduled to be broadcast or formerly broadcast on TeleOnce.

Current programming

Original programming

Acquired programming

Upcoming programming

Former programming

Original programming

Television series 
El Chapo (April 23, 2017 – July 25, 2018)
No me compares (August 30, 2018 – November 22, 2018)
Su Nombre Era Dolores (January 22, 2017 – April 16, 2017)

Telenovelas 
Amar a muerte (January 14, 2019 – April 18, 2019)
La bella y las bestias (June 18, 2018 – October 1, 2018)
La Piloto (April 17, 2017 – August 7, 2017, season 1; October 8, 2018 – January 10, 2019, season 2)

News/public affairs programming 
Despierta Puerto Rico (April 3, 2017 – 2018)
Edición Puerto Rico (March 19, 2018 – July 9, 2021)
Los Seis de la Tarde (April 27, 2015 – October 2017)
Notanserio Univision (February 26, 2017 – April 9, 2017)
Sal y pimienta (September 17, 2010  – February 12, 2017)

Talk/reality shows 
¡Ahora Es! (May 7, 2018 – January 14, 2021)
 ¡Ahora es que es! (March 8, 2021 – July 30, 2021)
Buen Viaje
Dale Replay (February 17, 2017 – March 24, 2017)
Estos Dos Sin Frenos (April 4, 2016 – October 7, 2018)
La gran sorpresa (January 14, 2018 – February 18, 2018)
La Noche Encima (March 7, 2016 – June 23, 2017)
Reina de la Canción (September 22, 2019 – November 24, 2019)
Tarde en la noche con Luis González (May 5, 2018 – October 17, 2020)
Una Buena Tarde (February 8, 2016 – October 2017)
La Banda (September 13, 2015 – December 11, 2016)
Va por ti (September 7, 2014 – September 4, 2016)
Yo soy un gamer (May 5, 2018 – January 16, 2021)

Acquired programming

Telenovelas 
Abismo de pasión (May 7, 2012 – January 3, 2013)
Amor de barrio (May 16, 2016 – September 26, 2016)
Apocalipsis (March 2, 2020 – July 3, 2020)
A que no me dejas (July 31, 2017 – May 7, 2018)
Bloque de búsqueda (April 2, 2017 – February 10, 2018)
Caer en tentación (January 15, 2018 – May 31, 2018)
Cita a ciegas (September 14, 2020 – December 21, 2020)
Despertar contigo (September 19, 2016 – February 13, 2017)
Diseñando tu amor (May 31, 2021 – July 6, 2021)
Dulce ambición (November 16, 2020 – May 7, 2021)
El color de la pasión (March 29, 2017 – June 23, 2017)
El Dragón (October 21, 2019 – February 21, 2020)
El hotel de los secretos (January 31, 2016 – May 24, 2016)
El regreso de Lucas (April 15, 2017 – February 10, 2018)
El Rico y Lázaro (May 1, 2018 – November 19, 2018)
Enamorándome de Ramón (February 5, 2018 – May 4, 2018)
¿Qué culpa tiene Fatmagül? (July 6, 2020 – January 15, 2021)
Huérfanos de su tierra (August 2, 2021 – December 3, 2021)
Imperio de mentiras (January 18, 2021 – May 28, 2021)
La candidata (August 8, 2017 – January 12, 2018)
La doble vida de Estela Carrillo (January 2, 2018 – April 12, 2018)
La esquina del diablo (June 15, 2015 – September 21, 2015)
La que no podía amar (February 20, 2012 – October 9, 2012)
La Madrastra (June 27, 2005 – December 15, 2005; July 19, 2021 – January 4, 2022, rerun)
La reina de Indias y el conquistador (June 14, 2021 – August 6, 2021)
La reina soy yo (June 17, 2019 – October 14, 2019)
La Tierra Prometida (August 7, 2017 – April 30, 2018)
La verdad oculta (September 11, 2006 – March 3, 2007)
Lady, la vendedora de rosas (September 22, 2015 – January 15, 2016; April 1, 2017 – March 31, 2018, rerun)
Las amazonas (April 16, 2018 – July 12, 2018)
Like (December 9, 2018 – December 8, 2019)
Lo imperdonable (September 15, 2015 – March 10, 2016)
Los elegidos (November 14, 2020 – July 24, 2021)
Love Divina (November 6, 2017 – February 2, 2018)
Los Díez Mandamientos (May 2, 2016 – September 8, 2016, season 1; February 14, 2017 – May 18, 2017, season 2)
Me declaro culpable (February 24, 2020 – May 22, 2020)
Médicos (August 4, 2020 – November 15, 2020)
Mi adorable maldición (May 1, 2017 – February 2, 2018)
Mi marido tiene familia (January 21, 2019 – June 7, 2019, season 1; July 23, 2019 – February 28, 2020, season 2)
Muchacha italiana viene a casarse (February 8, 2016 – May 24, 2016)
Mujeres de negro (October 29, 2016 – June 4, 2017)
Papá a toda madre (January 15, 2018 – June 14, 2018)
Pasión y poder (June 27, 2016 – January 6, 2017)
Por amar sin ley (June 4, 2018 – October 5, 2018, season 1; April 22, 2019 – August 27, 2019, season 2)
Por ella soy Eva  (April 9, 2012 – December 6, 2012; September 29, 2016 – March 28, 2017, rerun)
Ringo (March 30, 2020 – May 29, 2020)
Simplemente María (July 16, 2018 – January 17, 2019)
Si nos dejan (July 12, 2021 – November 5, 2021)
Sin tu mirada (June 10, 2019 – November 19, 2019)
Sueño de amor (June 6, 2016 – September 6, 2016)
Te acuerdas de mí (March 29, 2021 – July 9, 2021)
Te doy la vida (May 25, 2020 – August 3, 2020)
Tormenta en el paraíso (November 2, 2009 – July 28, 2010)
Totalmente Diva (June 26, 2017 – April 11, 2018)
Tres Milagros (March 30, 2019 – October 12, 2019)
Tres veces Ana (September 6, 2016 – February 1, 2017)
Un camino hacia el destino (September 6, 2016 – January 4, 2017)
Vencer el desamor (November 10, 2020 – March 26, 2021)
Vino el amor (June 26, 2017 – January 1, 2018)
Yago (July 11, 2016 – September 26, 2016)
Y mañana será otro día (May 25, 2020 – September 9, 2020)
Yo no creo en los hombres (March 7, 2016 – July 8, 2016)
Zeynep (April 22, 2019 – June 14, 2019, season 1; October 15, 2019 – February 21, 2020, season 2)

Television series 
9-1-1 (March 10, 2019 – August 2, 2020)
Agents of S.H.I.E.L.D. (May 15, 2018 – February 1, 2020)
Covert Affairs  (January 3, 2016 – March 25, 2017)
Cuna de lobos (January 12, 2020 – May 9, 2020)
Demente criminal (April 1, 2015 – June 11, 2015)
Descontrol (January 7, 2018 – February 4, 2018)
Dogma (May 17, 2018 – August 9, 2018)
El Princípe (September 27, 2016 – December 7, 2016; February 17, 2018 – August 11, 2018)
Esta historia me suena (July 27, 2019 – October 12, 2019)
Falsos falsificados (August 18, 2018 – January 26, 2019)
Heroes Reborn (February 6, 2016 – February 25, 2017)
Jesús (November 26, 2018 – July 22, 2019)
José de Egipto (June 26, 2017 – August 7, 2017)
La Embajada (February 4, 2017 – April 1, 2017)
La Madame (January 20, 2015 – March 31, 2015)
La usurpadora (September 16, 2019 – October 18, 2019)
La viuda negra 2 (July 10, 2016 – March 26, 2017)
Los milagros de Jesús (May 22, 2017 – June 25, 2017)
Los Mosqueteros (June 4, 2017 – 2018)
Los Simpsons (October 13, 2015 – October 18, 2020)
Metástasis (October 20, 2014 – January 19, 2015)
Niño Santo (August 2, 2015 – August 23, 2015, first-run; January 18, 2016 – January 29, 2016, rerun)
Por siempre Joan Sebastian (September 24, 2016 – November 19, 2016)
Quantico (May 16, 2018 – February 1, 2020)
Rubí (February 24, 2020 – March 26, 2020)
Ruta 35 (January 21, 2016 – March 11, 2016)
Sansón y Dalila (July 28, 2019 – September 15, 2019)
Sin miedo a la verdad (October 19, 2019 – May 9, 2020)
Soy Luna (June 4, 2017 – May 20, 2018)
The Resident (May 19, 2019 – August 30, 2020)
This Is Us (March 10, 2019 – October 18, 2020)
Velvet (October 3, 2016 – March 18, 2019)

Comedy programming 
40 y 20 (July 30, 2017 – 2018)
Los González (May 6, 2017 – 2018)
Mi lista de exes (March 16, 2019 – April 27, 2019)
Mita y mita (August 3, 2019 – October 26, 2019)
Renta congelada (December 8, 2018 – April 27, 2019)
Simón dice (May 4, 2019 – July 27, 2019)

Talk/reality shows 
Desafío Super Regiones (January 18, 2021 – March 5, 2021)
Familias frente al fuego (July 21, 2019 – August 25, 2019)
Inseparables: Amor al límite (May 27, 2019 – August 15, 2019)
Noche de Luz (August 13, 2017 – September 5, 2020)
Resistiré (October 19, 2019 – November 7, 2020)
Reto 4 Elementos: Naturaleza Extrema (April 7, 2018 – May 8, 2019)

Game shows 
Recuerda y Gana (October 2, 2016 – 2017)
Al final todo queda en familia (May 6, 2018 – July 8, 2018)

Children’s programming 
Ángeles (November 5, 2017 – March 1, 2020)
Atención Atención (November 8, 2009 – January 10, 2021)
Dragones: Carrera al borde (January 19, 2020 – September 20, 2020)
Fairy Tales (June 4, 2017 - February 28, 2021)
Las Aventuras de Pocketville (November 5, 2017 – March 1, 2020)
Nikki
The Avatars (March 8, 2018 – April 19, 2020)
Woki Tokis (September 9, 2018 – June 2, 2019)
Zona Y

Sports Programming 
 
WWC Las Super Estrellas de la Lucha Libre (1973 - 1980 ,1986 - 1990)
NBA Jam

References

WLII-DT